Paul Jones  (October 27, 1895 – November 7, 1971) was an elected chairman of the Navajo Tribal Council in 1955 and re-elected in 1959.  On March 4, 1963 he was defeated by Raymond Nakai.

Sources
Lafarge, Oliver. (MCMLVI). A Pictorial History of the American Indian. Crown Publishers Inc. Page 235.
"Long 'Sleep' Ends For U.S. Navajos", Calgary Herald, December 7, 1960
Paul Jones' obituary in The Deseret News, November 10, 1971

Chairmen of the Navajo Tribe
1895 births
1971 deaths
20th-century Native Americans